The 1925 Kansas City Cowboys season was their second in the league and first as the Cowboys. The team improved on their previous output of 2–7, losing only five games. They finished thirteenth in the league.

Schedule

Standings

References

Kansas City Cowboys seasons
Kansas City Cowboys
Kansas City